The Colonial Office was a government department of the Kingdom of Great Britain and later of the United Kingdom, first created to deal with the colonial affairs of British North America but required also to oversee the increasing number of colonies of the British Empire. Despite its name, the Colonial Office was never responsible for all Britain's Imperial territories; for example, protectorates fell under the purview of the Foreign Office, and British India was ruled by the East India Company until 1858 (the British crown ruled the India Office as a result of the Indian Mutiny), while the role of the Colonial Office in the affairs of the Dominions changed as time passed.

It was headed by the Secretary of State for the Colonies, also known more informally as the Colonial Secretary.

First Colonial Office (1768–1782)
Prior to 1768, responsibility for the affairs of the British colonies was part of the duties of the Secretary of State for the Southern Department and a committee of the Privy Council known as the Board of Trade and Plantations.  Separately, the  Indian Department was responsible for relations with indigenous nations in North America from 1755 onwards.

In 1768 the separate American or Colonial Department was established, in order to deal with colonial affairs in British North America. With the loss of thirteen of its colonies, however, the department was abolished in 1782. Responsibility for the remaining colonies was given to the Home Office, and subsequently in 1801 transferred to the War Department.

War and Colonial Office (1801–1854)
The War Office was renamed the War and Colonial Office in 1801, under a new Secretary of State for War and the Colonies, to reflect the increasing importance of the colonies. In 1825 a new post of Under-Secretary of State for the Colonies was created within this office. It was held by Robert William Hay initially. His successors were James Stephen, Herman Merivale, Frederic Rogers, Robert Herbert and Robert Henry Meade.

From 1824, the British Empire (excepting India, which was administered separately by the East India Company and then the British Raj) was divided by the War and Colonial Office into the following administrative departments:

North America
 Bermuda
 British North America
 Canada
 Newfoundland

West Indies
 Jamaica
 British Windward Islands
 British Honduras
 British West Indies
 British Guiana
 British Leeward Islands

Mediterranean and Africa
 Malta
 Gibraltar
 Ionian Islands
 Sierra Leone and the West African Forts, Consulates to the Barbary States
 Cape Colony (South Africa)

Australian colonies

 South Australia
 New South Wales

 Swan River Colony (Western Australia)
 Van Diemen's Land (Tasmania)

Eastern colonies

 Ceylon
 Mauritius

Second Colonial Office (1854–1966)
In 1854, the War and Colonial Office was divided in two, the War Office and a new Colonial Office, created to deal specifically with affairs in the colonies and assigned to the Secretary of State for the Colonies. The Colonial Office did not have responsibility for all British possessions overseas: for example, both the British Raj and other British territories near India, were under the authority of the India Office from 1858. Other, more informal protectorates, such as the Khedivate of Egypt, fell under the authority of the Foreign Office.

After 1878, when the Emigration Commission was abolished, an Emigration Department was created in the Colonial Office. This was merged with the General Department in 1894, before its complete abolition in 1896.

The increasing independence of the Dominions – Australia, Canada, New Zealand, Newfoundland and South Africa – following the 1907 Imperial Conference, led to the formation of a separate Dominion Division within the Colonial Office. From 1925 onwards the UK ministry included a separate Secretary of State for Dominion Affairs.

After the Cairo Conference held in March 1921, the Colonial Office was charged for the Palestine Mandate administration in substitution of the Foreign Office.

On 16 April 1947, the Irgun placed a bomb at the Colonial Office which failed to detonate. The plot was linked to the 1946 Embassy bombing.

After the Dominion of India and Dominion of Pakistan gained independence in 1947, the Dominion Office was merged with the India Office to form the Commonwealth Relations Office.

In 1966, the Commonwealth Relations Office was re-merged with the Colonial Office, forming the Commonwealth Office. Two years later, this department was itself merged into the Foreign Office, establishing the Foreign and Commonwealth Office.

The Colonial Office had its offices in the Foreign and Commonwealth Office Main Building in Whitehall.

The Colonial Office List
From 1862, the Colonial Office published historical and statistical information concerning the United Kingdom's colonial dependencies in The Colonial Office List, though between 1926 and 1940 it was known as The Dominions Office and Colonial Office List. It later became known as the Commonwealth Relations Office Year Book and Commonwealth Office Year Book. In addition to the official List published by the Colonial Office, an edited version was also produced by Waterlow and Sons. It can be difficult to distinguish between the two versions in library catalogue descriptions. For example, The Sydney Stock and Station Journal of 3 December 1915 commented:

Timeline

See also
Colonial Land and Emigration Commission
Colonial Service
List of British Empire-related topics

References

Further reading
 
 Egerton, Hugh Edward. A Short History of British Colonial Policy (1897) 610pp online
 Laidlaw, Zoë. Colonial connections, 1815-45: patronage, the information revolution and colonial government (Oxford University Press, 2005).

Primary sources
 Bell, Kenneth Norman, and William Parker Morrell, eds. Select documents on British colonial policy, 1830-1860 (1928)

1768 establishments in Great Britain
1782 disestablishments in Great Britain
1854 establishments in the United Kingdom
1966 disestablishments in the United Kingdom
Defunct departments of the Government of the United Kingdom
Governance of the British Empire
Colonial ministries